Sunit Shome (born 22 August 1932) is an Indian former cricketer. He played 18 first-class matches for Bengal between 1952 and 1961.

See also
 List of Bengal cricketers

References

External links
 

1932 births
Living people
Indian cricketers
Bengal cricketers
Cricketers from Kolkata